Alma Wade is the main antagonist and mascot of the F.E.A.R. series of first-person shooter horror video games by Monolith Productions.  F.E.A.R. was introduced in 2005. The plot of the series revolves around the mystery of Alma. She is a psychic who seeks revenge against Armacham Technology Corporation, due to their usage of her in a series of experiments.

In video games
Alma Wade initially appears to the player as an eight-year-old girl wearing a red dress and has a blank, mask-like face almost completely obscured by long black hair. In the final part of the first game (and some preceding visions), her appearance changes to that of a naked, emaciated adult woman. As Alma is a powerful psychic, it is not clear as to whether Alma is real, or if she only exists in the minds of the people seeing her. Bloody footprints can be found in some of the places where she walks. She can also be briefly visible on a CCTV monitor in the treatment plant, in the same room where Bill Moody was interrogated.

Alma was born on August 26, 1979, and was a severely troubled child with tremendous psychic powers who suffered nightmares and was attuned to the negative emotions of the people around her. Her father, Harlan Wade, noticed her powers not long after birth and introduced her to Armacham Technology Corporation's experiments when she was three years old. Armacham tested Alma for every type of psychic power, and she passed all tests. At the age of five, Alma began to purposefully fail Armacham's tests. When she was six, she set fire to a lab in the Project Origin facility and began to attack the scientists experimenting on her by using her psychic powers. The scientists began to suffer delusions, sudden mood changes, and vivid nightmares. When Armacham realized that the only thing stopping Alma from doing much worse things to the scientists was her young age, they devised a plan to keep her alive but were unable to psychically attack anyone.

At the age of seven, Alma was recruited into ATC's "Project Origin" to create psychic individuals from a psychic forbear: two days before her eighth birthday, in 1987, she was put into an induced coma and locked in the Vault, a structure located deep inside the secret Origin Facility. During the project, Alma was impregnated twice with prototypes created from her own DNA mixed with that of the Origin researchers. She gave birth to a first prototype, the F.E.A.R. Point Man, when she was 15 years old, and then a second, Paxton Fettel, when she was 16. Life support was removed from the Vault when Alma was 26, leading ATC to believe she was dead. According to Harlan Wade, her physical body died six days after the removal of life support, but according to F.E.A.R. 2, her psychic energy continued to linger long after her heart stopped, fueled by the hatred of her rageful spirit.

Alma is seen repeatedly across the games, often out of the corner of the player's eye, standing in the shadows, behind windows, or darting quickly out of sight. In the first game, her appearances are usually preceded by a static radio transmission, logged as "Unknown Origin". Her appearances are often accompanied by scenes of extreme violence. Sometimes all that is heard is her soft, giggling laugh, or whispered indistinct words. Project Origin shows that Alma can shift her appearance and that all three versions of Alma are all just different manifestations of one woman.

In F.E.A.R. 2: Project Origin, Alma initially appears to Sergeant Michael Becket at the beginning of the game in a hallucination in her child form, and subsequently appears for most of the game in her adult form after the destruction of the Origin reactor. Alma targets Becket due to his part in Project Harbinger, whereby he is endowed with the same psychic abilities as the F.E.A.R. Point Man and thus is affected by her in similar ways. Alma herself is drawn to him, with Genevieve Aristide describing Becket as a "beacon" for her (an entry in a computer log establishes Becket's 100-percent compatibility score). An Armacham researcher going by "Snake Fist" theorizes that Alma is drawn to Becket by a desire to kill and "absorb" him. When Alma initially makes contact with Becket in the school, she pulls back and regards him with interest; she then manifests in her third form, a naked, shapely young woman (reflecting her newfound desire towards Becket). During the course of the game, Alma attacks the other candidates for Project Harbinger, killing two of them. She also psychically attacks Harold Keegan, enthralling him and causing him to wander into the abandoned Still Island nuclear power plant. She attacks Becket himself physically, often assaulting and grappling with him, which he constantly fends off. Other times, she pulls Becket into hallucinations, often centering on a grassy hill and a single tree, from which Alma plays with a swing set that can be found on the Still Island reactor. Ultimately, when Alma is poised to kill Becket, she instead spares his life, having clearly developed feelings for him. Becket and squadmate Keira Stokes attempt to use a telesthetic amplifier to amplify Becket's own psychic abilities to defeat Alma, but before they can try, Aristide kills Stokes and sabotages the plan, intending to seal Alma away with Becket and use her as leverage. Alma arrives before Aristide seals the device, and turns her attention on Becket, allowing Aristide to seal them away. Alma establishes a psychic bond with Becket and sends his mind into a hallucination where he fights off distorted images of Keegan while trying to activate the chamber within the hallucination, all while Alma is raping Becket in the real world. At the end of the battle, Becket is apparently still sealed within the device. The door to the chamber then opens, revealing a destroyed landscape indicating that Becket is seeing things from Alma's point of view. Alma appears before him, and is pregnant after conceiving a child with him. As she places Becket's hand on her belly, the fetus inside her utters "Mommy".

While no longer a proper villain in F.E.A.R. 3, Alma's actions are still considered antagonistic due to the contractions from her pregnancy coming to an end causing even more nightmares to appear and terrorize the world, so the only way they can disappear completely is if her two sons, Point Man and Paxton Fettel, ensure she dies during childbirth. After destroying the undead manifestation of their grandfather, Harlan Wade, who goes by the name "Creep", the two brothers battle each other for the fate of their new half-sibling. The winning brother, depending on player actions, helps Alma give birth to her new child. Afterward, her child will be taken from her by one of the brothers. She either disappears (and possibly still exists) if the Point Man kills Fettel, or is eaten and "killed/absorbed" by Fettel if he kills the Point Man.

Design and promotion

Alma is named after the character Alma Mobley in Peter Straub's novel Ghost Story. F.E.A.R. lead designer Craig Hubbard said he wanted to give players, "enough clues so that [they] can form [their] own theories about what's going on, but ideally [they will] be left with some uncertainty". Hubbard said his most direct influence for the child Alma was Kiyoshi Kurosawa's Seance, but he was also inspired by Sadako Yamamura and the twins in The Shining. The developers chose to make Alma's dress red for "a variety of reasons". Her signature outfit and appearance are altered significantly in F.E.A.R. 3. A glow-in-the-dark statue of pregnant Alma was bundled with the Collectors Edition set of F.E.A.R. 3.

Reception
The character of Alma Wade was very well received. In 2008, The Age ranked Alma as the 34th greatest Xbox character of all time for being "a genuinely memorable and haunting character from a horror game", adding that "it's really thanks to her and her alone" that Project Origin has been "one of our most anticipated games". That same year, GameDaily ranked her as seventh on the list of most horrific video game bosses, while PC Games Hardware listed her as one of the 112 most important female characters in games. In 2010, Alma was one of the 64 characters chosen by GameSpot for the poll "All-Time Greatest Game Villain", but lost in the first round to the Joker. In 2011, UGO.com ranked her as 9th on the list of the  scariest characters in video games and 7th on the list of "the absolute greatest" psychic characters in video game history,  while PlayStation Official Magazine listed her among the "PlayStation's meanest mothers". That same year, IGN ranked the "terrifying" Alma as the 73rd top video game villain, praising the developers' "wonderful job of crafting all sorts of horrific effects using low-tech solutions" and adding: "No matter how similar Alma might seem to Samara and other horror characters, any gamer worth their weight in blood will tell you that she's a villain in a league all on her own". In 2011, Complex ranked her as 15th on the list of "most diabolical video game she-villains", and in 2012, they ranked her as the 7th most evil woman in video games, as well as the 50th "coolest" video game villain. That same year, FHM included her on their list of ten scariest game characters ever. GamesRadar staff thought highly of Alma's role as an antagonist, and consistently ranked her in published lists of the best villains in video games. That same year, Liz Lanier of Game Informer included Alma among the top ten female villains in video games, stating that "each one of Alma's three forms has more disturbing implications than the last. Whether she looks like Sadako as a child, or appears in her emaciated state as a woman, it doesn't bode well for the player. Even her more attractive form is terrifying considering she only uses it as a lure". In 2014, Lisa Foiles of The Escapist ranked the "creepy, scary, horryfying, terryfying, awful little" Alma as number one creepiest child in video games.

References

Child characters in video games
F.E.A.R. (video game series)
Female characters in video games
Female video game villains
Fictional mass murderers
Fictional rapists
First-person shooter characters
Ghost characters in video games
Horror video game characters
Science fiction video game characters
Video game characters introduced in 2005
Video game characters who have mental powers
Video game bosses
Video game mascots